Boy Kills World is an upcoming American action-thriller film directed by Moritz Mohr in his feature directorial debut from a screenplay by Arend Remmers and Tyler Burton Smith and a story by Mohr and Remmers. Produced by Sam Raimi and Roy Lee, it stars Bill Skarsgård, Jessica Rothe, Yayan Ruhian, Isaiah Mustafa, and Andrew Koji. The plot follows Boy (Skarsgard), a deaf-mute who is trained in the jungle by a mysterious mentor (Ruhian) after his family is murdered. Filming took place in South Africa.

Premise
When his family is murdered, a deaf-mute named Boy escapes to the jungle, where he is trained by a mysterious mentor.

Cast
 Bill Skarsgård as Boy
 Cameron and Nicholas Crovetti as younger versions of Boy
 Jessica Rothe as June 27
 Yayan Ruhian as Boy's mentor
 Isaiah Mustafa as Benny
 Andrew Koji as Basho
 Famke Janssen as Hilda van der Koy
 Brett Gelman as Gideon van der Koy
 Sharlto Copley as Glen van der Koy
 Quinn Copeland as Mina
 Michelle Dockery as Melanie van der Koy

Production
Boy Kills World is an action film written by Arend Remmers and Tyler Burton Smith. It is directed by German filmmaker Moritz Mohr in his feature directorial debut. Mohr created a short film of the same name and later did preliminary work on the feature-length story with Remmers. Produced by Sam Raimi and Roy Lee, it is an American co-production between Raimi Productions, Vertigo Entertainment, Nthibah Pictures, and Hammerstone Studios. The film was announced on October 7, 2021, with Bill Skarsgård, Samara Weaving, and Yayan Ruhian joining the cast. In a statement, Nthibah Pictures CEO Simon Swart said the film would combine "real-world themes with a stylized look that is fresh, cool, and original, borrowing from the best of graphic novels." On October 28, 2021, Isaiah Mustafa joined the cast. In January 2022, Andrew Koji was added to the cast, and Jessica Rothe replaced Samara Weaving, who dropped out of project due to scheduling conflicts. Filming began in Cape Town, South Africa, on February 14, 2022. In March 2022, Famke Janssen, Brett Gelman, Sharlto Copley, Quinn Copeland, twins Cameron and Nicholas Crovetti, and Michelle Dockery were confirmed to star.

References

External links
 

Upcoming films
American action thriller films
Features based on short films
Films about deaf people
Films about murder
Films produced by Roy Lee
Films produced by Sam Raimi
Films set in jungles
Films shot in South Africa
Upcoming directorial debut films
Upcoming English-language films
Vertigo Entertainment films